Hor Lhamo was a woman from Northwestern China who led a revolt against her Tibetan feudal rulers in 1918.

Biography 
Qinghai, now in Northwestern China used to be under the dominion of Tibet, and the feudal government at Lhasa required payment of tribute from the local nomadic serfs.  Hor Lhamo's family suffered under these requirements and in 1918 led a delegation representing 150 families to the local ruler to protest the excessive taxation.  This was refused and Lhamo returned with what has been described as a peasant army.

Lhamo's army defeated the Tibetan authorities, taking 45 soldiers prisoner and killing the local ruler.  The Tibetan government responded by sending a superior force to restore order.  Lhamo's revolt was subdued and she was executed.

References 

1910s in Tibet
Qinghai